Yoni Alejandro Mosquera Palacio (born 23 March 2002) is a Colombian professional footballer who plays as a left-back for Leixões.

Club career
Mosquera is a youth product of Estudiantil and Leones before moving to Porto B on 25 September 2020. He made his professional debut with Porto B in a 4–0 Liga Portugal 2 loss to S.C. Covilhã on 31 October 2020.

References

External links

2002 births
Living people
People from Antioquia
Colombian footballers
Colombia youth international footballers
Association football fullbacks
FC Porto B players
Liga Portugal 2 players
Colombian expatriate footballers
Colombian expatriates in Portugal
Expatriate footballers in Portugal